Lorraine Fullbrook, Baroness Fullbrook (born 28 July 1959) is a British Conservative former MP for South Ribble, first elected in 2010.

Educated at Glasgow Caledonian University, Mrs Fullbrook was formerly the Conservative Leader of Hart Council in Hampshire. She joined the Cabinet of the council as the Cabinet Member for Communications. Six months later, she was promoted to Cabinet Member for Finance. Six months after taking over the finance portfolio, she was elected as Leader of the Council, after serving just one year as Councillor.

She stepped down from Hart Council in 2004 after being selected as parliamentary candidate for the South Ribble constituency in north-west England.

She first contested the seat at the 2005 general election, when she came second to the incumbent MP, David Borrow. She contested the seat again in the 2010 general election when she defeated David Borrow with an 8.1% swing from the Labour Party to the Conservative Party, and regained the seat for the Conservative Party after 13 years.

In 2013 she announced that she would not contend the next election and would be standing down after just one term.

Fullbrook was nominated for a life peerage by Boris Johnson in the 2019 Dissolution Honours List. On 7 September 2020 she was created Baroness Fullbrook, of Dogmersfield in the County of Hampshire.

References

External links
Official website

1959 births
Living people
Alumni of Glasgow Caledonian University
UK MPs 2010–2015
Conservative Party (UK) MPs for English constituencies
Conservative Party (UK) life peers
Female members of the Parliament of the United Kingdom for English constituencies
Members of the Parliament of the United Kingdom for constituencies in Lancashire
Politicians from Glasgow
UK MPs who were granted peerages
21st-century British women politicians
21st-century English women
21st-century English people
Life peeresses created by Elizabeth II